Paul Geheeb (1870–1961) was a German pedagogue in the German rural boarding school movement known for co-founding the boarding schools Wickersdorf Free School Community, Odenwaldschule, and Ecole d'Humanité.

References

Further reading 

 
 
 
 

1870 births
1961 deaths
19th-century German educators
20th-century German educators
Commanders Crosses of the Order of Merit of the Federal Republic of Germany